Kalanchoe beauverdii'' is a species of flowering plant in the family Crassulaceae. It goes by the common name  Beauverd's widow's-thrill. 

The species was described and named by Raymondl Hamet in the year 1907. The perennials can grow up to 3 to 5 metres.

The species is native to Madagascar. It is also native to Comoros.

References

Flora of Madagascar
beauverdii
Flora of the Comoros
Plants described in 1907